Anthony Stephen Stiles (born 25 March 1935) is a former member of the Legislative Assembly of Alberta. He was born at Oldham, England.

Stiles first ran for the Progressive Conservatives in the February 1982 by-election in Olds-Didsbury that saw Gordon Kesler from the Western Canada Concept elected. He was defeated running a distant third behind Alberta Social Credit Party candidate Lloyd Quantz.

Stiles won the 1982 general election months later, and served the riding of for one term in office from 1982 to 1986 as the first Conservative elected to the riding.

References

External links
Stiles Wins! Front Page The Gazette November 3, 1982
A Philosophical History of Property Rights, by Steve Stiles

Progressive Conservative Association of Alberta MLAs
English emigrants to Canada
People from Oldham
Living people
1935 births